The Stemnitsa Silver-Gold-Smithery School (Scholi Argyrochrysochoias Stemnitsas) is a publicly funded school where students learn to craft jewelry from silver and gold, hence its name. It is located in Stemnitsa, Arcadia, in southern Greece. The school was established in the 1970s, with its first director being Lambis Katsoulis.

External links
School website  
Silvery School
Municipality of Trikolones

Buildings and structures in Arcadia, Peloponnese
Trikolones
Schools in Greece